A foreign direct investment (FDI) is an investment in the form of a controlling ownership in a business, in real estate or in productive assets such as factories in one country by an entity based in another country. It is thus distinguished from a foreign portfolio investment or foreign indirect investment by a notion of direct control.

The origin of the investment does not impact the definition, as an FDI: the investment may be made either "inorganically" by buying a company in the target country or "organically" by expanding the operations of an existing business in that country.

Definitions
Broadly, foreign direct investment includes "mergers and acquisitions, building new facilities, reinvesting profits earned from overseas operations, and intra company loans". In a narrow sense, foreign direct investment refers just to building new facility, and a lasting management interest (10 percent or more of voting stock) in an enterprise operating in an economy other than that of the investor. FDI is the sum of equity capital, long-term capital, and short-term capital as shown in the balance of payments. FDI usually involves participation in management, joint-venture, transfer of technology and expertise. Stock of FDI is the net (i.e., outward FDI minus inward FDI) cumulative FDI for any given period. Direct investment excludes investment through purchase of shares (if that purchase results in an investor controlling less than 10% of the shares of the company).

FDI, a subset of international factor movements, is characterized by controlling ownership of a business enterprise in one country by an entity based in another country. Foreign direct investment is distinguished from foreign portfolio investment, a passive investment in the securities of another country such as public stocks and bonds, by the element of "control". According to the Financial Times, "Standard definitions of control use the internationally agreed 10 percent threshold of voting shares, but this is a grey area as often a smaller block of shares will give control in widely held companies. Moreover, control of technology, management, even crucial inputs can confer de facto control."

Theoretical background

Before Stephen Hymer's landmark work on FDI in 1960, there was no theory existed that dealt specifically with FDI. However, there are theories that dealt generally with foreign investments. Both Eli Heckscher (1919) and Bertil Ohlin (1933) developed the theory of foreign investments by using neoclassical economics and macroeconomic theory. Based on this principle, the differences in the costs of production of goods between two countries cause specialisation of jobs and trade between countries. Reasons for differences in costs of production can be explained by factor proportions theory. For example, countries with a greater proportion of labour will engage in labor-intensive industries while countries that have a greater proportion of capital will engage in capital-intensive industries. However, such a theory makes the assumption that there is perfect competition, there is no movement of labour across country borders, and the multinational companies assumes risk neutral preferences. In 1967, Weintraub tested this hypothesis by collecting United States data on rate of return and flow of capital. However, the data failed to support this hypothesis. Data from surveys on the motivation of FDI also failed to support this hypothesis.

Intrigued by the motivations behind large foreign investments made by corporations from the United States of America, Hymer developed a framework that went beyond the existing theories, explaining why this phenomenon occurred, since he considered that the previously mentioned theories could not explain foreign investment and its motivations. Facing the challenges of his predecessors, Hymer focused his theory on filling the gaps regarding international investment. The theory proposed by the author approaches international investment from a different and more firm-specific point of view. As opposed to traditional macroeconomics-based theories of investment, Hymer states that there is a difference between mere capital investment, otherwise known as portfolio investment, and direct investment. The difference between the two, which will become the cornerstone of his whole theoretical framework, is the issue of control, meaning that with direct investment firms are able to obtain a greater level of control than with portfolio investment. Furthermore, Hymer proceeds to criticize the neoclassical theories, stating that the theory of capital movements cannot explain international production. Moreover, he clarifies that FDI is not necessarily a movement of funds from a home country to a host country, and that it is concentrated on particular industries within many countries. In contrast, if interest rates were the main motive for international investment, FDI would include many industries within fewer countries.

Another observation made by Hymer went against what was maintained by the neoclassical theories: foreign direct investment is not limited to investment of excess profits abroad. In fact, foreign direct investment can be financed through loans obtained in the host country, payments in exchange for equity (patents, technology, machinery etc.), and other methods.

The main determinants of FDI is side as well as growth prospectus of the economy of the country when FDI is made. Hymer proposed some more determinants of FDI due to criticisms, along with assuming market and imperfections.  These are as follows:

 Firm-specific advantages: Once domestic investment was exhausted, a firm could exploit its advantages linked to market imperfections, which could provide the firm with market power and competitive advantage. Further studies attempted to explain how firms could monetize these advantages in the form of licenses.
 Removal of conflicts: conflict arises if a firm is already operating in foreign market or looking to expand its operations within the same market. He proposes that the solution for this hurdle arose in the form of collusion, sharing the market with rivals or attempting to acquire a direct control of production. However, it must be taken into account that a reduction in conflict through acquisition of control of operations will increase the market imperfections.
 Propensity to formulate an internationalization strategy to mitigate risk: According to his position, firms are characterized with 3 levels of decision making: the day to day supervision, management decision coordination and long-term strategy planning and decision making. The extent to which a company can mitigate risk depends on how well a firm can formulate an internationalization strategy taking these levels of decision into account.

Hymer's importance in the field of international business and foreign direct investment stems from him being the first to theorize about the existence of multinational enterprises (MNE) and the reasons behind FDI beyond macroeconomic principles, his influence on later scholars and theories in international business, such as the OLI (ownership, location and internationalization) theory by John Dunning and Christos Pitelis which focuses more on transaction costs. Moreover, "the efficiency-value creation component of FDI and MNE activity was further strengthened by two other major scholarly developments in the 1990s: the resource-based (RBV) and evolutionary theories" In addition, some of his predictions later materialized, for example the power of supranational bodies such as IMF or the World Bank that increases inequalities (Dunning & Piletis, 2008). A phenomenon the United Nations Sustainable Development Goal 10 aims to address.

Types of FDI
The types of FDI investments can be classified based on the perspective of the investor/source country and host/destination country. On an investor perspective, it can be divided into horizontal FDI, vertical FDI, and conglomerate FDI. In the destination country, the FDI can be divided into import-substituting, export-increasing, and government initiated FDI. Horizontal FDI arises when a multination corporation duplicates its home country industry chain into the destination country to produce similar goods. Vertical FDI takes place when a multinational corporation acquires a company to exploit the natural resources in the destination country (backward vertical FDI) or by acquiring distribution outlets to market its products in the destination country (forward vertical FDI). Conglomerate FDI is the combination between horizontal and vertical FDI.

Platform FDI is the foreign direct investment from a source country into a destination country for the purpose of exporting to a third country.

Methods
The foreign direct investor may acquire voting power of an enterprise in an economy through any of the following methods:

 by incorporating a wholly owned subsidiary or company anywhere
 by acquiring shares in an associated enterprise
 through a merger or an acquisition of an unrelated enterprise
 participating in an equity joint venture with another investor or enterprise

Forms of FDI incentives
Foreign direct investment incentives may take the following forms:

 low corporate tax and individual income tax rates
 tax holidays
 other types of tax concessions
 preferential tariffs
 special economic zones
 EPZ – export processing zones
 bonded warehouses
 maquiladoras
 investment financial subsidies
 free land or land subsidies
 relocation & expatriation
 infrastructure subsidies
 R&D support
 energy
 derogation from regulations (usually for very large projects)

FDI
FDI flows are more likely to go countries with democratic institutions.

A 2010 meta-analysis of the effects of foreign direct investment (FDI) on local firms in developing and transition countries suggests that foreign investment robustly increases local productivity growth.

Europe 
According to a study conducted by EY, France was in 2020 the largest foreign direct investment recipient in Europe, ahead of the UK and Germany. EY attributed this as a "direct result of President Macron's reforms of labor laws and corporate taxation, which were well received by domestic and international investors alike." Moreover, 24 countries of the EU made an investment into Armenian economy since the year of Armenian Independence.

China 
FDI in China, also known as RFDI (renminbi foreign direct investment), has increased considerably in the last decade, reaching $19.1 billion in the first six months of 2012, making China the largest recipient of foreign direct investment at that point of time and topping the United States which had $17.4 billion of FDI. In 2013 the FDI flow into China was $24.1 billion, resulting in a 34.7% market share of FDI into the Asia-Pacific region. By contrast, FDI out of China in 2013 was $8.97 billion, 10.7% of the Asia-Pacific share. During the global financial crisis FDI fell by over one-third in 2009 but rebounded in 2010. China implemented the Foreign Investment Law in 2020.

India
Foreign investment was introduced in 1991 under Foreign Exchange Management Act (FEMA), driven by then finance minister Manmohan Singh. India disallowed overseas corporate bodies (OCB) to invest in India. India imposes cap on equity holding by foreign investors in various sectors, current FDI in aviation and insurance sectors is limited to a maximum of 49%. A 2012 UNCTAD survey projected India as the second most important FDI destination (after China) for transnational corporations during 2010–2012. As per the data, the sectors that attracted higher inflows were services, telecommunication, construction activities and computer software and hardware. Mauritius, Singapore, US and UK were among the leading sources of FDI. Based on UNCTAD data FDI flows were $10.4 billion, a drop of 43% from the first half of the last year. In 2015, India emerged as top FDI destination surpassing China and the US. India attracted FDI of $31 billion compared to $28 billion and $27 billion of China and the US respectively.

United States
Broadly speaking, the United States has a fundamentally "open economy" and low barriers to the FDI.

U.S. FDI totaled $194 billion in 2010. Of FDI in the United States in 2010, 84% came from or through eight countries: Switzerland, the United Kingdom, Japan, France, Germany, Luxembourg, the Netherlands, and Canada. A major source of investment is real estate; the foreign investment in this area totaled $92.2 billion in 2013, under various forms of purchase structures (considering the U.S. taxation and residency laws).

A 2008 study by the Federal Reserve Bank of San Francisco indicated that foreigners hold greater shares of their investment portfolios in the United States if their own countries have less developed financial markets, an effect whose magnitude decreases with income per capita. Countries with fewer capital controls and greater trade with the United States also invest more in U.S. equity and bond markets.

White House  data reported in 2011 found that a total of 5.7 million workers were employed at facilities highly dependent on foreign direct investors. Thus, about 13% of the American manufacturing workforce depended on such investments. The average pay of said jobs was found as around $70,000 per worker, over 30% higher than the average pay across the entire U.S. workforce.

President Barack Obama said in 2012, "In a global economy, the United States faces increasing competition for the jobs and industries of the future. Taking steps to ensure that we remain the destination of choice for investors around the world will help us win that competition and bring prosperity to our people."

In September 2013, the United States House of Representatives voted to pass the Global Investment in American Jobs Act of 2013 (H.R. 2052; 113th Congress), a bill which would direct the United States Department of Commerce to "conduct a review of the global competitiveness of the United States in attracting foreign direct investment". Supporters of the bill argued that increased foreign direct investment would help job creation in the United States.

Eurasia 
In November 2021, a report from the Eurasian Development Bank revealed that Kazakhstan boasted the highest FDI stock value from the Eurasian Economic Union (EAEU) with $11.2 billion by 2020 and an increase of over $3 billion since 2017.

Armenia 
According to the World Bank, Armenia takes the first place in terms of FDI appeal among Commonwealth of Independent States. The Armenian government has created a favorable environment for foreign investments by introducing new laws and conditions. The country was named ‘The Caucasian Tiger’ because of its dynamic economy. Some of the measures to attract FDI include free economic zones (FEZ) with relaxed laws, also, profit tax, VAT, and property tax benefits. In particular, The Most Favored Nation (MFN) and National Treatment regimes are in effect, and the government has chosen a "open door" policy with ongoing legal protection to encourage international investment. A highly beneficial business environment is guaranteed for international investors under the law "On Foreign Investments." Additionally, it guarantees the protection of foreign capital invested in Armenian businesses and permits limitless involvement. Research shows that Cyprus, Germany, Netherlands, UK, and France have made an altogether investment in an amount 1.4 USD billion in the period 2007-2013.

See also 

 Bilateral investment treaty
 Foreign direct investment and the environment
 Foreign exchange controls
 Investment promotion agency
 List of countries by FDI abroad
 List of countries by received FDI
 Foreign ownership

References

External links
 
 Foreign Direct Investment in the United States. Transactions. 
 Foreign Direct Investment in the United States Department of Commerce and Council of Economic Advisers
 Interactive Historical Data: Foreign Direct Investment in the United States — Flow Federal Reserve Board of Governors
 OECD Benchmark Definition of Foreign Direct Investment (2008)
 IMF: How Countries Measure FDI (2001)

 
Economic geography
International business
International factor movements
International macroeconomics